The End of America is a 2008 documentary film directed by Annie Sundberg and Ricki Stern, adapted from Naomi Wolf's 2007 book, The End of America: Letter of Warning to a Young Patriot. The film analyzes policy changes made during the Bush Administration, and makes the case that these changes threaten American democracy.

Synopsis
The End of America details the ten steps a country takes when it slides toward fascism. The film takes a historical look at trends in once-functioning democracies from modern history, based on Wolf's 2007 book The End of America: Letter of Warning to a Young Patriot. The films asserts such trends are being repeated in America today, and puts the recent gradual loss of civil liberties in the U.S. in a historical context. "The average American might not be alarmed at AT&T selling our private information to the Bush administration, but when this action is seen as part of a larger series of erosions and events, a pattern emerges with unfortunate consequences that become disturbingly clear."

Style
The film's style is similar to that of An Inconvenient Truth in that Wolf presents a lecture, filmed with multiple cameras, to an interactive audience. Break-away segments featuring both talking-head and "fly on the wall" interviews demonstrate the historical echoes and present-day consequences of the erosion of America's Constitution. These interviews are from a diverse collection of individuals, including intelligence community top brass, who are willing to talk on camera about the uselessness of "intelligence" gained through torture. The film also features grassroots political leaders, military generals, and victims of undermined civil liberties.

The Ten Steps

Wolf outlines ten steps that "closing societies" – such as Hitler's Germany, Mussolini's Italy, and Stalin's Russia – have historically followed. These steps, Wolf claims, are being observed in America now.

The steps are:

 Invoke a terrifying internal and external enemy.
 Create secret prisons where torture takes place.
 Develop a thug caste or paramilitary force not answerable to citizens.
 Set up an internal surveillance system.
 Harass citizens' groups.
 Engage in arbitrary detention and release.
 Target key individuals.
 Control the press.
 Treat all political dissidents as traitors.
 Suspend the rule of law

Distribution

The End of America is viewable online free of charge. It has been made available in this way through IndiePix Films and Snag Films.

References

External links
 
 IndiePix Films

2008 films
American documentary films
2008 documentary films
Civil liberties in the United States
Films directed by Ricki Stern and Anne Sundberg
2000s English-language films
2000s American films